Japanese Caribbeans are people of Japanese ethnic origin living in the Caribbean. There are small but significant populations of Japanese people and their descendants living in Cuba, the Dominican Republic, and Jamaica.

Sub-groups
Caribbean Islands:
 Japanese Cubans
 Japanese settlement in the Dominican Republic
 Japanese expatriates in Jamaica

Mainland Caribbean:
 Japanese migration to Colombia
 Japanese Brazilians

See also
 Afro-Caribbean
 Chinese Caribbeans
 Indo-Caribbeans
 White Caribbeans
 Japanese Brazilians
 Japanese Peruvians

References

Further reading
 
 
 

 
Ethnic groups in the Caribbean
Japanese diaspora